Rock Is Not Enough is the eleventh studio album by Polish thrash metal band Acid Drinkers. It was released on 24 May 2004. It is the only album to feature Tomek "Lipa" Lipnicki.

The album was mastered at Studio Master and Seven in Hamburg, Germany. The original working title of the album was Rock Is Not Enough... Give Me the Metal!. The first pressings of the album were released with an outer cardboard cover.

Track listing 
All lyrics written by Titus. All music composed by Acid Drinkers.

Credits 
Acid Drinkers
Tomek "Titus" Pukacki – vocals, bass, artwork
Darek "Popcorn" Popowicz – lead guitar
Maciek "Ślimak" Starosta – drums, production
Tomek "Lipa" Lipnicki – rhythm guitar, vocals on "The Ball and the Line" and "Stray Bullets"

Additional musicians
Bolek – guitars on "Hate Unlimited" and "Stray Bullets"

Production
Adam Toczko – mixing, production
Marie Sokolowski – artwork
Gosia Taklińska – product manager
Anna "Dudzia" Dudzewicz – lyrics translation

References 

2004 albums
Acid Drinkers albums